The 2001 Sanex Trophy was a women's tennis tournament played on outdoor clay courts in Knokke-Heist, Belgium that was part of the Tier IV category of the 2001 WTA Tour. It was the third and last edition of the tournament and was held from 16 July until 22 July 2001. Unseeded Iroda Tulyaganova won the singles title and earned $23,500 first-prize money.

Finals

Singles
 Iroda Tulyaganova defeated  Gala León García, 6–2, 6–3
 It was Tulyaganova's 2nd singles title of the year and the 3rd of her career.

Doubles
 Virginia Ruano Pascual /  Magüi Serna defeated  Ruxandra Dragomir Ilie /  Andreea Ehritt-Vanc, 6–4, 6–3

References

External links
 ITF tournament edition details
 Tournament draws

Knokke-Heist
WTA Knokke-Heist
2001 in Belgian tennis